Dimitriana Surdu (born 12 April 1994) is a Moldovan athlete who specialises in the shot put. She qualified for 2016 Summer Olympics.

Personal bests

Outdoor

Indoor

References

External links 
 

1994 births
Living people
Moldovan female athletes
Moldovan female shot putters
Athletes (track and field) at the 2016 Summer Olympics
Olympic athletes of Moldova
World Athletics Championships athletes for Moldova
Athletes (track and field) at the 2015 European Games
European Games competitors for Moldova
Athletes (track and field) at the 2020 Summer Olympics
20th-century Moldovan women
21st-century Moldovan women